Lytta is a genus of blister beetles in the family Meloidae. There are about 70 described species in North America, and over 100 species worldwide.

Selected species
These species, and others, belong to the genus Lytta:

 Lytta aenea Say, 1824
 Lytta aeneipennis (LeConte, 1851)
 Lytta agrestis (Fall, 1901)
 Lytta arizonica Selander, 1957
 Lytta augusti Haag-Rutenberg, 1880
 Lytta auriculata Horn, 1870 (red-eared blister beetle)
 Lytta battonii Kaszab, 1962
 Lytta biguttata LeConte, 1853
 Lytta bipuncticollis Haag-Rutenberg, 1880
 Lytta blaisdelli (Fall, 1909)
 Lytta boleti Marsham, 1802
 Lytta bruchi Pic, 1927
 Lytta canelas Selander, 1960
 Lytta cardinalis Chevrolat, 1834
 Lytta childi LeConte, 1857
 Lytta chloris (Fall, 1901)
 Lytta comans Selander, 1960
 Lytta corallifera Haag-Rutenberg, 1880
 Lytta cribrata LeConte, 1853
 Lytta crotchi (Horn, 1874)
 Lytta crotchii (Horn, 1874)
 Lytta cyanipennis (LeConte, 1851) (green blister beetle)
 Lytta deserticola Horn, 1870
 Lytta ebenina (Dugès, 1877)
 Lytta erebea (Champion, 1892)
 Lytta erythrothorax (Herrera & Mendoza, 1867)
 Lytta eucera (Chevrolat, 1834)
 Lytta flavicollis Gyllenhal, 1817
 Lytta fulvipennis LeConte, 1853
 Lytta funerea (Fall, 1901)
 Lytta hirsuta
 Lytta hoppingi Wellman, 1912
 Lytta icterica Gyllenhal, 1817
 Lytta insperata (Horn, 1874)
 Lytta koltzei Haag-Rutenberg, 1880
 Lytta lecontei Heyden, 1890
 Lytta lineola
 Lytta lugens (LeConte, 1851)
 Lytta lugubris (Horn, 1873)
 Lytta magister Horn, 1870 (master blister beetle)
 Lytta manicata J.Sahlberg, 1903
 Lytta margarita (Fall, 1901)
 Lytta medvedevi Shapovalov, 2016
 Lytta melaena LeConte, 1858
 Lytta melanurus (Hope, 1831)
 Lytta michoacanae (Champion, 1892)
 Lytta mirifica Werner, 1950 (Anthony blister beetle)
 Lytta moerens (LeConte, 1851)
 Lytta moesta (Horn, 1878)
 Lytta molesta (Horn, 1885)
 Lytta morosa (Fall, 1901)
 Lytta morrisoni (Horn, 1891) (Morrison's blister beetle)
 Lytta mutilata (Horn, 1875)
 Lytta navajo Werner, 1951
 Lytta nigripilis (Fall, 1901)
 Lytta nigrocyanea Van Dyke, 1929
 Lytta nitidicollis (LeConte, 1851)
 Lytta nuttalli Say, 1824 (Nuttall's blister beetle)
 Lytta peninsularis (Fall, 1901)
 Lytta plumbea Haag-Rutenberg, 1880
 Lytta polita Say, 1824 (bronze blister beetle)
 Lytta proteus Haag-Rutenberg, 1880
 Lytta puberula LeConte, 1866
 Lytta quadrimaculata (Chevrolat, 1834)
 Lytta rathvoni LeConte, 1853
 Lytta refulgens Horn, 1870
 Lytta regiszahiri Kaszab, 1958
 Lytta reticulata Say, 1824
 Lytta sanguinea Haag-Rutenberg, 1880
 Lytta sayi LeConte, 1853 (Say blister beetle)
 Lytta scitula (Champion, 1892)
 Lytta scituloides Selander, 1960
 Lytta skrylniki Shapovalov, 2016
 Lytta sonorae Van Dyke, 1947
 Lytta strigata Gyllenhal, 1817
 Lytta stygica (LeConte, 1851)
 Lytta sublaevis (Horn, 1868)
 Lytta tenebrosa (LeConte, 1851)
 Lytta unguicularis (LeConte, 1866)
 Lytta variabilis (Dugès, 1869)
 Lytta vesicatoria (Linnaeus, 1758)
 Lytta viridana LeConte, 1866
 Lytta vulnerata (LeConte, 1851)
 † Lytta aesculapii Heer, 1847
 † Lytta lithophila (Wickham, 1914)

References

Further reading

External links

 
 

Meloidae
Tenebrionoidea genera